Santa Maria della Visitazione al Ponte delle Lame, is a church or sanctuary in central Bologna, Italy.

At one time, the church was built around an oratory in the middle of a bridge, and surrounded by the Reno Canal. It was founded in 1527, when an icon in a tabernacle on the bridge became the site for prayers during an epidemic of the plague. After the epidemic ebbed, an oratory was built at the site of the tabernacle. The interior was reconstructed in 1764 in a late Baroque style, and linked to Confraternity of the Poor of Saint Roch. On July 16, 1942, it was declared a Marian Sanctuary. The structure is now deconsecrated.

Sources
Beni Culturali Emilia Romagna

Maria della Visitazione al Ponte delle Lame
18th-century Roman Catholic church buildings in Italy